Brandon High School is a public high school in Brandon, Florida, United States.  It is overseen by the School District of Hillsborough County.

History 
The school originally opened in 1914 on the current site of McLane Middle School, for the education of white students only. In 1966, due to the federal lawsuit Manning vs. the School Board of Hillsborough County, a small group of African-American students were permitted to attend for the first time, and in 1971 large scale busing to improve integration of the school commenced. In 2001 the school district achieved unitary status and mandated busing was ended. In 1972, the school moved to its current location on Victoria Street in Brandon. The school colors are maroon and white. The school mascot is the Eagle. Brandon High is currently Pending school grade in SDHC's high school grading scale. The school has been awarded Blue Ribbon School status.

Demographics
The demographic breakdown of the 1,957 students enrolled in 2012-2013 was:
Male - 51.8%
Female - 48.2%
Native American/Alaskan - 0.4%
Asian/Pacific islanders - 2.2%
Black - 19.7%
Hispanic - 30.0%
White - 44.0%
Multiracial - 3.7%

Additionally, 54.3% of the students were eligible for free or reduced lunch.

Athletics

Wrestling team 
The Brandon wrestling team holds the national record for the longest winning streak (34 years, 459 wins) by a high school sports team. The streak came to an end on January 5, 2008, when Brandon was defeated by South Dade High School 32–28.

Soccer
Brandon High boys won the state championship in 2003.

Brandon High School nature preserve 
This approximately  wooded site located on the south side of the campus was designated an official Schoolyard Habitat in 2006 by the National Wildlife Federation.  Ecology students help collect animal and plant data annually using a variety of tools and technologies including Global Positioning Satellite (GPS) receivers and digital cameras.

They also construct nesting boxes for birds and roosting boxes for bats to help increase the biodiversity of the area.  Many other classes use the area as an outdoor classroom, including art, English, performing arts, and technology.

Notable alumni 

 Scott Blake, visual artist
 J. S. G. Boggs, visual artist
 Terry Butler, bassist for death metal acts Obituary, Death, Six Feet Under, and Massacre
 Chris Cates, former professional baseball player.
 Mark Consuelos, actor
 Rick Barrio Dill, bass guitar player
 Chone Figgins, former professional baseball player
 David Galloway, former professional football player
 Franklin Gomez, freestyle wrestler
 Joey Graham, former professional basketball player
 Stevie Graham, former professional basketball player
 Danny Graves, former professional baseball player
 Garry Hancock, former professional baseball player
 Frederick Hutson, entrepreneur
 Gene Killian, former professional football player
 Toney Mack, former professional basketball player
 Admiral Charles D. Michel, 30th Vice Commandant of the United States Coast Guard
 Paul Orndorff, former professional wrestler
 Mike Pucillo, former professional football player
 Jody Reed, former professional baseball player
 Dwayne Schintzius, former professional basketball player
 Ronda Storms, Florida state legislature
 Ozzie Timmons, baseball player and coach
 Jeff Turner, former professional basketball player

References

External links 
 Brandon High School website
 School profile

Educational institutions established in 1914
High schools in Hillsborough County, Florida
Public high schools in Florida
1914 establishments in Florida